Nicole Beukers (born 7 October 1990) is a Dutch rower. She competed in the women's quadruple sculls event at the 2016 Summer Olympics.

References

External links

1990 births
Living people
Dutch female rowers
Olympic rowers of the Netherlands
Rowers at the 2016 Summer Olympics
Rowers at the 2020 Summer Olympics
Olympic silver medalists for the Netherlands
Olympic medalists in rowing
Medalists at the 2016 Summer Olympics
People from Leiderdorp
World Rowing Championships medalists for the Netherlands
Sportspeople from South Holland
21st-century Dutch women
20th-century Dutch women
20th-century Dutch people